Howard Edward Storie (May 15, 1911 – July 27, 1968) was a professional baseball catcher. He was a reserve player for the Boston Red Sox of Major League Baseball (MLB) in 1931 and 1932.

Biography
Storie, nicknamed "Sponge", had a minor league career spanning 1931 to 1935; he played in a total of 131 minor league games for several different teams in the Eastern United States.
 
Storie's major league career consisted of 12 games with the Boston Red Sox; six in 1931 and another six in 1932. He went 5-for-25 for a .200 batting average, with two runs scored and no RBIs. Two of his major league hits came against Hall of Fame pitcher Herb Pennock on April 16, 1932. Entering a game against the New York Yankees  defensively in the fifth inning, Storie singled off of Pennock in the seventh inning and again in the ninth.

After his baseball career, Storie operated a restaurant in Lenox, Massachusetts; he died in 1968, aged 57, in his hometown of Pittsfield, Massachusetts.

References

Further reading

External links

Boston Red Sox players
Major League Baseball catchers
Baseball players from Massachusetts
Hazleton Mountaineers players
Reading Red Sox players
Worcester Chiefs players
Manchester Indians players
Waltham/Worcester Rosebuds players
Elmira Pioneers players
1911 births
1968 deaths